Princess Elizabeth of Tooro (Elizabeth Christobel Edith Bagaaya Akiiki; born 9 February 1936) is the Batebe (Princess Royal) of the Kingdom of Tooro. She is a Ugandan lawyer, politician, diplomat, and model. She was the first East African woman to be admitted to the English Bar. She is a paternal aunt of the King of Tooro, Rukidi IV. She briefly served as minister of foreign affairs under Idi Amin from February to November 1974.

Early life and education 

The Princess was born in 1936 to Rukidi III of Tooro, the eleventh Omukama of Toro who reigned between 1928 and 1965. Her mother was  Queen Kezia, a daughter of Nikodemo Kakoro, a senior chief. Her title from birth was Omubiitokati or Princess.

After finishing elementary school from the present Kyebambe Girls' Secondary School, she was sent to Gayaza High School, a girls' boarding school in Buganda, followed by Sherborne School for Girls in England, where she was the only black student.  "I felt that I was on trial and that my failure to excel would reflect badly on the entire black race," she later wrote. After one year, she was accepted into Girton College, Cambridge, the third African woman to be admitted to the University of Cambridge in the institution's history. In 1962, she graduated from Cambridge with a law degree. Three years later, in 1965, the princess became a barrister-at-law as a member of Gray's Inn, becoming the first woman from East Africa to be called to the English Bar.

Royal life and modelling 

Around this time, her father died, and her brother Patrick David Matthew Kaboyo Olimi was enthroned as Olimi III, the twelfth Omukama of Toro, who reigned from 1965 until 1995. At the coronation, Elizabeth received the title and office of Batebe (Princess Royal), which traditionally made her the most powerful woman in the Tooro Kingdom and the most trusted adviser of the king.

King Fredrick Mutesa II of Buganda, another of Uganda's traditional kingdoms, was now the president, with Prime Minister Milton Obote. Barely one year after the coronation of the Omukama Olimi III, Obote attacked the Buganda Palace, sending Edward Muteesa II into exile, and declared himself president. Soon, he abolished all Ugandan traditional kingdoms, including Toro. Elizabeth was afraid for her brother's life, but he escaped to London.

Elizabeth later completed an internship at a law firm, and became Uganda's first female lawyer. She was a virtual prisoner in her own country until Princess Margaret of the United Kingdom sent her an invitation to model in a charity fashion show. The princess was a smash hit, and soon became a highly successful fashion model, being featured in many magazines. Jacqueline Kennedy Onassis met Elizabeth at a party, and convinced her to move to New York City. In 1971, Obote was overthrown by General Amin, and Elizabeth returned to Uganda. Amin's rule was arguably even more repressive than Obote's, with Amin executing and imprisoning many people. In 1974, Amin appointed Elizabeth minister of foreign affairs.

Exile and return 

In February 1975, Elizabeth escaped to Kenya, then to Vienna, then to London. Four years later, Elizabeth returned to Uganda to help with the country's first free national elections, which were won by Obote, who continued killing his enemies. Elizabeth and her lover, Prince Wilberforce Nyabongo, son of Prince Leo Sharp Ochaki, escaped to London in 1980 and married in 1981. In 1984, Elizabeth played the part of Shaman in the Columbia Pictures film Sheena: Queen of the Jungle

Finally in 1985, Obote was overthrown and following a brief period of military rule, was replaced by Yoweri Museveni. In 1986, Elizabeth was appointed ambassador to the United States, a job she held until 1988. Later that year, Nyabongo, an aviation engineer, was killed in a plane crash at the age of 32.

Following the death of her husband, Elizabeth opted to leave public service and get involved in charity work, in addition to being an official guardian of her brother's son, Rukidi IV, who was born in 1992 and has been the reigning Toro monarch since 1995. Following a period of service as Uganda's Ambassador to Germany and the Vatican, Elizabeth accepted an appointment as Uganda's High Commissioner to Nigeria.

See also

 First female lawyers around the world
 Juliana Kanyomozi

References

Bibliography 

 Hassen, Joyce. African Princess. New York: Hyperion, 2004
 Elizabeth of Toro. Elizabeth of Toro: The Odyssey of an African Princess. New York: Simon and Schuster.

External links 

 Biography of Elizabeth Bagaaya 
 Princess Elizabeth Bagaaya of Toro
 Toro royal family site 
 Princess Elizabeth Bagaaya
Unto she who has, more shall be given and even more demanded

Toro people
Elizabeth of Toro
Foreign Ministers of Uganda
Ugandan royalty
Alumni of Girton College, Cambridge
Members of Gray's Inn
Ambassadors of Uganda to the United States
People educated at Gayaza High School
High Commissioners of Uganda to Nigeria
Living people
Ugandan female models
Female foreign ministers
Ugandan women ambassadors
People educated at Sherborne Girls
Ambassadors of Uganda to the Holy See
20th-century Ugandan lawyers
Ugandan women lawyers